The 2022–23 Borussia Dortmund II season is the club's second consecutive season back in the 3. Liga since their relegation in the 2014–15 season.

Squad

Competitions

Friendlies

3. Liga

Table

Matches

References 

Borussia Dortmund II seasons
Football in Germany